Kerevat National High School, also known as the Kerevat School of Excellence, is a government high school in the  East New Britain Province of Papua New Guinea (PNG) that takes admissions from throughout PNG for Grades 11 and 12. It was founded in 1947.

Description
The school is located on the Gazelle Peninsula in East New Britain. It was the first high school in the Territory of New Guinea, beginning life as an institute for the training of teachers. It is a boarding school and has a student population of up to 800 and a teaching staff of about 50. About 50–60% of its students come from the Islands Region of the country, with the rest from the mainland provinces. The school offers the following subjects: language and literature; applied English; general and advanced mathematics; chemistry; biology; physics; applied science; geology; economics; accounting; business studies; legal studies; history; geography; and information and communication technology (ICT).

Controversy
In 2011 the school suffered temporary closure for a variety of reasons, including alleged cult activities and satanic worship, fights and other social problems, and deteriorating school facilities, together with allegations of misuse of funds for their rehabilitation, with particular allegations being made about the businessman, Eremas Wartoto.

In January 2022, local landowners briefly closed down the school. They were protesting that the land for the school had been taken illegally in 1947, without compensation and that since that time the school had taken water without payment. Although the school reopened, the issue of compensation remained unresolved.

Former students
Bernard Narokobi, politician, author and diplomat
Cherubim Dambui, politician and Roman Catholic bishop
Robert Atiyafa, member of parliament, government minister and former premier of Eastern Highlands Province
Catherine Davani, judge of the Supreme Court of Papua New Guinea
Rona Nadile, anti-corruption whistleblower

References

Further reading
Short, Barbara. 2009. Tuum Est: The Early History of Keravat National High School and Its Students 1947-1986. ISBN 978-0646514031

Educational institutions established in 1947
National high schools in Papua New Guinea
East New Britain Province